Stephen Tomasin (born 25 September 1994) is an American rugby union player who plays for the United States national rugby sevens team in the World Rugby Sevens Series.

During his high school years, Tomasin played American football as a running back. In his senior year at Cardinal Newman High School, he was voted North Bay League Offensive MVP. He began playing rugby in high school in 2012. Tomasin played college rugby with the San Diego State Aztecs. In 2013, Tomasin was played with the USA Rugby Men's Collegiate All-Americans during his freshman year of college.
Tomasin plays his club rugby with OMBAC in the Pacific Rugby Premiership.

U.S. national sevens team
Tomasin debuted for the U.S. national rugby team as a teenager at the 2013 Gold Coast Sevens. He represented the U.S. national team at the 2015 Pan American Games. He suffered a setback in the fall of 2015, however, when he tore his ACL, and as a result he was out for several months. At 21 years old, Tomasin was the youngest of the 26 U.S. rugby players vying for a place on the U.S. 12-man roster for the 2016 Summer Olympics, but he missed out on national team selection.

Tomasin returned to the squad for the 2016-17 Sevens Series. He scored eight tries at the 2017 Singapore Sevens, and was one of three U.S. players to make the seven-man dream team.
Tomasin returned for the 2017–18 Sevens Series, but was injured and missed several tournaments. Tomasin played some spells at halfback, instead of his usual forward position, due to injuries to scrum-half Madison Hughes and utility back Maka Unufe. Tomasin had an excellent 2018–19 Series; he played in every match en route to the U.S. best ever second-place finish, and finished as one of the three U.S. players selected for the Dream Team composed of the seven best players.

Tomasin was selected to represent the United States at the 2022 Rugby World Cup Sevens in Cape Town.

Season by season

References

Living people
1994 births
American rugby union players
Pan American Games medalists in rugby sevens
Pan American Games bronze medalists for the United States
Rugby sevens players at the 2015 Pan American Games
San Diego State Aztecs athletes
Sportspeople from Santa Rosa, California
Male rugby sevens players
United States international rugby union players
Medalists at the 2015 Pan American Games
Rugby sevens players at the 2020 Summer Olympics
Olympic rugby sevens players of the United States